James Alexander Ruth (born 21 January 1985) is an English professional golfer.

Ruth was born in Plymouth, England.

Ruth was the Order of Merit (money) leader on the third-tier EPD Tour in 2008. In 2008, he had three wins on the EPD tour earning €23,440.93. He spent the 2010 season on the European Tour.

Professional wins (9)

EPD Tour wins (5)

Hi5 Pro Tour wins (2)

Jamega Pro Golf Tour wins (2)

Team appearances
Professional
PGA Cup (representing Great Britain and Ireland): 2022

See also
2009 European Tour Qualifying School graduates

References

External links

English male golfers
European Tour golfers
Sportspeople from Plymouth, Devon
1985 births
Living people